Shumway, also known as Shumay, is a populated place situated in Navajo County, Arizona. It was named after Charles Shumway, a member of the Church of Jesus Christ of Latter-day Saints, who settled the location.

Demographics

References

Populated places in Navajo County, Arizona